Korokolets is a rural locality (a settlement) in Lentyevskoye Rural Settlement, Ustyuzhensky District, Vologda Oblast, Russia. The population was 9 as of 2002. There are 10 streets.

Geography 
Vanskoye is the nearest rural locality.

References 

Rural localities in Ustyuzhensky District